Eremophila brevifolia, also known as spotted eremophila, is a flowering plant in the figwort family, Scrophulariaceae and is endemic to the south-west of Western Australia. It is an erect, open, spindly shrub with sticky, short, serrated leaves and white to pink flowers and is only known from a few scattered populations.

Description

The tube is a shade of white to pale purple on the outside and white with yellow spots inside. The petal lobes are glabrous except for the lower lobe which is covered with long hairs near its base. The inside of the tube is also filled with long, soft hairs. There are 4 stamens which are enclosed in the petal tube.

Taxonomy and naming
The species was first formally described by Friedrich Gottlieb Bartling in 1845 as Myoporum brevifolium and the description was published in Plantae Preissianae. In 1847, Alphonse de Candolle changed the name to Pseudopholidia brevifolia and in 1859, Ferdinand von Mueller changed it to Eremophila brevifolia. The specific epithet (brevifolia) is derived from the Latin words brevis meaning "short" and folia meaning "leaves".

Distribution and habitat
Eremophila brevifolia is only known from three small, scattered areas near Geraldton, Northampton and Kellerberrin in the Geraldton Sandplains, Avon Wheatbelt and Jarrah Forest biogeographic regions where it grows near rivers.

Conservation status
Eremophila brevifolia is classified as "Priority Two" by the Western Australian Government Department of Biodiversity, Conservation and Attractions, meaning that it is poorly known and from only one or a few locations.

Use in horticulture
The small, delicate white flowers of this species contrast with its bright, glossy green leaves. It is a hardy plant, resistant to frost and to drought. It is easily propagated from cuttings and will grow in a range of soils and aspects, including partial shade.

References

brevifolia
Eudicots of Western Australia
Plants described in 1845
Endemic flora of Western Australia
Taxa named by Friedrich Gottlieb Bartling